Lewis v. Clarke, 581 U.S. ___ (2017), is a case in which the Supreme Court of the United States ruled 8–0 that tribal sovereign immunity does not apply in a suit against a tribal employee in his individual capacity, and an indemnification provision cannot extend tribal sovereign immunity to cases in which it would otherwise not apply. Justice Sonia Sotomayor delivered the majority opinion. Justice Clarence Thomas and Justice Ruth Bader Ginsburg each wrote concurring opinions that both said that tribal sovereign immunity does not apply in suits arising from commercial activity off of tribal territory. Justice Neil Gorsuch was not involved in the discussion or decision of this case.

References

External links
 

United States Supreme Court cases
United States Supreme Court cases of the Roberts Court
2017 in United States case law
United States tribal sovereign immunity case law